Fonnereau may refer to:
Claude Fonnereau (1677–1740), a French Huguenot refugee who settled in Ipswich, England and became a prominent merchant
Thomas Fonnereau (1699–1779), merchant and politician, son of Claude
Zachary Philip Fonnereau (1706–1778), merchant and politician, son of Claude
Philip Fonnereau (1739–1797), merchant and politician, son of Zachary Philip
Martyn Fonnereau (1741–1817), merchant and Director of the Bank of England, son of Zachary Philip
Thomas George Fonnereau (1789–1850), author and artist, grandson of Zachary Philip